Grand Bazaar or Great Bazaar, may refer to:
 Grand Bazaar, Isfahan, a historical market in Isfahan, Iran
 Grand Bazaar, Istanbul, one of the largest and oldest covered markets in the world
 Grand Bazaar, Tehran, a historical market situated in the capital of Iran, Tehran
 Grand Bazaar (Ürümqi), an Islamic bazaar in Ürümqi, Xinjiang, China
 Harvest Moon DS: Grand Bazaar, a farming game released for the Nintendo DS